For Richer For Poorer may refer to:
 "For Richer For Poorer" (The Green Green Grass), an episode of the BBC sitcom, The Green Green Grass
 For Richer...For Poorer, a 1975 BBC television pilot
 For Richer, for Poorer (film), a 1992 made-for-TV comedy film
 Lovers and Friends, an American soap opera, renamed For Richer, For Poorer

See also
 For Richer or Poorer, a 1997 American comedy film